Krasny Bor is a rural locality (a settlement) in Kalininskoye Rural Settlement, Totemsky District, Vologda Oblast, Russia. The population was 384 as of 2002. There are 6 streets.

Geography 
Krasny Bor is located 41 km southwest of Totma (the district's administrative centre) by road. Zuikha is the nearest rural locality.

References 

Rural localities in Tarnogsky District